Talaat Mansour (born 26 February 1967) is an Egyptian footballer. He played in 17 matches for the Egypt national football team from 1990 to 1994. He was also named in Egypt's squad for the 1990 African Cup of Nations tournament.

References

External links
 

1967 births
Living people
Egyptian footballers
Egypt international footballers
1990 African Cup of Nations players
Place of birth missing (living people)
Association football defenders